A crane tank (CT) is a steam locomotive fitted with a crane for working in railway workshops, docksides, or other industrial environments. The crane may be fitted at the front, centre or rear.  

The 'tank' in its name refers to water tanks mounted either side of the boiler, as cranes were usually constructed on tank locomotives (as opposed to tender locomotives) for greater mobility in the confined locations where they were normally used.
There is also a crane engine in the museum of Scottish railways

Preserved examples 

Shelton Iron & Steel Works No. 4101, an  built by Dübs & Company built in 1901, entering preservation on the East Somerset Railway in 1970, working 1977-1986 and later sold to the Foxfield Railway, where it entered service in 2010.
Millfield, an  built by Robert Stephenson & Hawthorns in 1942 (works no.7070), preserved at Bressingham Steam & Gardens.

See also
 Crane (rail)
 NLR crane tank
 Shelton Iron & Steel Works No. 4101
 Three GWR engines constructed as crane tanks based on 850 class

Further reading 
 Crane Tank Locomotives in Australia - Australian Railway Historical Society Bulletin, June 1985, pp123-139

References

External links

 Barclay crane tank no.2127 of 1942
 Dübs crane tank no. 4101
 RSH crane tank

Steam locomotive types
Cranes (machines)